Narihualá is an archaeological site in Peru. It is located in the Piura Region, Piura Province, Catacaos District a 17 km south of Piura. Is considered the capital of the Tallán Nation and is the most important architectural evidence of a great monument, both in its size and the prominent platforms of two pyramids.

References

External links

Piura Region
Archaeological sites in Peru